Wendy González Salinas  (born August 17, 1985) is a Mexican actress. She is best known for her main role in the series Como dice el dicho, and her role as co-protagonist in the telenovela Antes muerta que Lichita.

Filmography

Films

Television

References

External links 

1985 births
Living people
Actresses from Monterrey
Mexican telenovela actresses
Mexican voice actresses
20th-century Mexican actresses
21st-century Mexican actresses